The Luxembourg Grand Prix was the name given to two races of the FIA Formula One World Championship, held in 1997 and 1998.

The Luxembourg title was chosen in 1997 as the Hockenheimring was already contracted to host the German Grand Prix. The Nürburgring had previously hosted the European Grand Prix in 1995 and 1996, but it was renamed due to other changes in the 1997 schedule. Following the cancellation of the Portuguese Grand Prix, a second race in Spain was added, with Jerez hosting the European Grand Prix along with the Spanish Grand Prix at Barcelona. Jerez was due to host the race again in 1998, but the rights to the European Grand Prix had been revoked from the organisers of the race after an incident on the podium in 1997. In 1999 the Nürburgring race returned to using the European Grand Prix title, which it held every year until 2007.

History

1997 

As it was, the Luxembourg Grand Prix provided a moment in history, as Renault-powered cars took the first four places at the finish with Jacques Villeneuve (Williams-Renault) taking first place. The race was also Villeneuve's final Formula One victory.

For a long time it looked as if Mika Häkkinen would take his first Formula One win as he pulled away at the front from his McLaren teammate David Coulthard. However, in the space of one lap, both McLarens had pulled out of the race with blown engines allowing Villeneuve to move close to an eventual World Championship. Michael Schumacher's race was over by the end of the first lap after his brother Ralf Schumacher collided with his teammate Giancarlo Fisichella at the first corner; this caused immediate retirement for three out of the four cars involved (Ralf, Fisichella, and Ukyo Katayama), and also caused suspension damage to the fourth car (Michael Schumacher's Ferrari) which also led to its retirement two laps later.

1998 

1998 saw Mika Häkkinen gain revenge for his engine failure at the previous race by taking victory at this one, with Michael Schumacher second despite qualifying on pole, and Häkkinen's teammate Coulthard third. Häkkinen also, like Villeneuve the year prior, went on to win the World Championship in the final race of the season at Suzuka; this meant that every winner of the Luxembourg GP went on to win that year's World Championship.

Winners 

A pink background indicates an event which was not part of the Formula One World Championship.

Notes

References

 
Formula One Grands Prix
National Grands Prix
Recurring sporting events established in 1949
Recurring sporting events disestablished in 1998